The initialism MASOC can refer to:

Military Uses
 Maritime Air Support Operations Center
 Mobile Air Support Operations Center
 Marine Artillery Scout Observer Course

Psychiatric Uses
 Massachusetts Adolescent Sexual Offender Coalition

Religious Uses
 Muslim American Society of  Orange County, California
 Malankara Archdiocese of the Syriac Orthodox Church